A Presidential election was held in India on 17 July 2017 with the votes counted and the results announced on 20 July 2017. President Pranab Mukherjee, whose term of office was due to expire on 24 July 2017, declined to seek re-election due to health concerns and old age.

Governor of Bihar Ram Nath Kovind of the Bharatiya Janata Party had the backing of the governing National Democratic Alliance coalition, and went up against opposition candidate Meira Kumar of the Indian National Congress in the vote. Kovind secured roughly two-thirds of the votes from the electoral college of elected members of federal, state and union territory legislatures and was elected to a five-year term as President. Kovind's term of office began on 25 July 2017.

Background 
There was initial speculation that the incumbent, Pranab Mukherjee, would seek re-election. However, he decided not to run again in 2017, meaning that his term in office ended on 24 July 2017.

Selection process 

The President of India is indirectly elected by an electoral college consisting of the elected members of both houses of parliament, the elected members of the Legislative assemblies of the 28 states and the elected members of the legislative assemblies of the Union Territories of Delhi,  Puducherry and Jammu and Kashmir. As of 2017, the electoral college comprises 776 MPs and 4,120 MLAs.
The system assigns varying numbers of votes to these electoral college members, such that the total weight of MPs and those of MLAs is roughly equal and that the voting power of states and territories are proportional to their population. Overall the members of the electoral college were eligible to cast 1,098,903 votes, yielding a threshold for a majority of 549,452 votes.

The nomination of a candidate for election to the office of the President must be subscribed by at least 50 electors as proposers and 50 electors as seconders. The election is held by means of a secret ballot under the single transferable vote system. The manner of election of President is provided by Article 55 of the Constitution.

The returning officer for the election was Anoop Mishra, the Secretary General of Lok Sabha.

Electoral college partisan composition
At the time of the election the NDA coalition itself was short of a majority by about 25,000 votes, but was expected to be able to rely on other parties to breach the small deficit without difficulty.

Public opinion
Although the election was not a popular vote, some general polling was performed to measure public opinion. In both Business Insider-Ipsos and NDTV polls comparing support of the two candidates, Kovind was the more popular choice with 71% and 63% support respectively.

Candidates 
Two candidates were nominated. Both the governing NDA coalition and the opposition UPA coalition put forward candidates from their dominant parties, the Bharatiya Janata Party and the Indian National Congress respectively.

National Democratic Alliance

United Progressive Alliance

Results 
Ram Nath Kovind was declared as the President-elect after the counting of votes which was held on 20 July 2017. He was administered oath by the Chief Justice of India Jagdish Singh Khehar, to take office as the 15th President of India on 25 July 2017 at the Central Hall located in The Parliament House, New Delhi.

Reactions 
Immediately after the results were announced, Prime Minister Narendra Modi tweeted,  In another tweet he added

See also 
 List of presidents of India
 List of Indian presidential elections
 Presidency of Ram Nath Kovind
 2017 Indian vice presidential election

References

External links 
 Full results table, by state
 Bihar governor Ram Nath Kovind is NDA's Presidential nominee: Amit Shah

Presidential elections in India
2017 elections in India
July 2017 events in India